In the anterior pituitary, the term "acidophil" is used to describe two different types of cells which stain well with acidic dyes. 

 somatotrophs, which secrete growth hormone (a peptide hormone)
 lactotrophs, which secrete prolactin (a peptide hormone)

When using standard staining techniques, they cannot be distinguished from each other (though they can be distinguished from basophils and chromophobes), and are therefore identified simply as "acidophils".

See also
 Eosinophilic
 Acidophile (histology)
 Basophilic
 Chromophobe cell
 Melanotroph
 Chromophil
 Basophil cell
 Oxyphil cell
 Oxyphil cell (parathyroid)
 Pituitary gland
 Neuroendocrine cell

References

Histology